The 1996 St. Louis Rams season was the franchise's 59th year with the National Football League (NFL) and the second season in St. Louis. It was marked by a 59–16 victory over the Atlanta Falcons in week 11. The Rams’ point tally in that game was the highest by an NFL team since 1989, when the Cincinnati Bengals scored 61 points. Safety Keith Lyle tied first for the league lead in interceptions, with 9. However, the Rams finished the season with a 6–10 record. Head coach Rich Brooks was fired after the season.

Offseason

NFL Draft

Personnel

Staff

Roster

Regular season

Schedule

Standings

External links 
 1996 St. Louis Rams at Pro-Football-Reference.com

St. Louis Rams
St. Louis Rams seasons
St Lou